Lucius Orbilius Pupillus (114 BC – c. 14 BC) was a Latin grammarian of the 1st century BC, who taught at school, first at Benevento and then at Rome, where the poet Horace was one of his pupils. Horace (Epistles, ii) criticizes his old schoolmaster and describes him as plagosus (a flogger), and Orbilius has become proverbial as a disciplinarian pedagogue.

One of his slaves, Scribonius Aphrodisius, went on to become a grammarian himself, and was purchased by Scribonia, wife of the emperor Augustus.

Bibliography 
 Suetonius Lives of the Eminent Grammarians, chapter 4
  Smith, Dictionary of Greek and Roman Biography and Mythology, v. 3 p. 40

114 BC births
10s BC deaths
People from the Province of Benevento
Grammarians of Latin
Latin writers known only from secondary sources
1st-century BC educators